Shires is a surname. Notable people with the surname include:

Amanda Shires (born 1982), American singer and violinist
Art Shires (1906–1967), American baseball player
Dana Shires (born 1932), Doctor, co-inventor of Gatorade
Jim Shires (born 1945), Canadian ice hockey player
Tom Shires (1925–2007), American trauma surgeon